Berg station may refer to:

 Berg metro station, a station on the Sognsvann Line (line 6) of the Oslo Metro in Norway
 Berg railway station, a closed railway station on the Østfold Line located at Berg in Halden, Norway.